Professor Thorsteinn I. Sigfusson (4 June 1954 in Vestmannaeyjar, Iceland – 15 July 2019) was an Icelandic physicist prominent in the field of energy research. He was awarded the Global Energy Prize in 2007, and was the Director of the Innovation Center Iceland at the University of Iceland, where he held the Icelandic Alloys Chair.

Education and professional work 
After studying at Hamrahlid College in Reykjavík, Thorsteinn graduated from the University of Copenhagen in 1978 with a degree in Physics. He earned his PhD in 1983 at Darwin College, Cambridge.

Thorsteinn worked as a Professor of Physics in The Science Institute at the University of Iceland, and served as Chairman of The Board of Science Institute (1986–90), University Library (1994), The Research Council of Iceland (1996–99), and the Technical Committee of RANNIS. He also acted as Director of The Engineering Institute and  Dean of Faculty of the Renewable Energy School in Akureyri. In 2003–07, he was Co-Chair of The International Partnership for the Hydrogen Economy, and in 2006 he created and chaired the Renewable Energy Prize Ceremony, first awarded by the World Renewable Energy Council during its world conference in Florence.

The companies and institutions he founded include:

 Eco Energy Iceland, the holding company behind the ECTOS projects and related renewable energy projects
 Icelandic New Energy, owned by the Icelandic energy sector as well as Daimler, Shell and Hydro, responsible for the introduction of hydrogen energy to Icelandic society
 Varmaraf, a company specializing in thermoelectrics for green electricity production and a novel electrolysis of water
 CRI. A company producing green methanol from geothermal CO2 and electrolytic hydrogen
 HBT, A company producing electric filter devices for correcting the electric performance of diesel generators and saving oil for ships
 RES, The Renewable Energy School in Akureyri, where an international masters level education is provided. Prof. Sigfusson co-led the Hydrogen and Fuel Cell faculty

Awards and decorations 
 British Council Fellowship, 1979
 Clerk-Maxwell award fellowship 1980 for the development of a new technique in magnetism research
 Elected Research Fellow, Darwin College, 1981
 Knighthood by the President of Iceland, January 1, 2004
 Laureate of the International Global Energy Prize, St. Petersburg, 2007

References 

1954 births
2019 deaths
20th-century physicists
21st-century physicists
Icelandic physicists
Thorsteinn Ingi Sigfússon
University of Copenhagen alumni
Alumni of Darwin College, Cambridge
Thorsteinn Ingi Sigfússon
Thorsteinn Ingi Sigfússon
Thorsteinn Ingi Sigfússon